Arthur Clarence Sandberg (September 19, 1899 – June 3, 1970) was a professional football player in the National Football League. He made his NFL debut in 1926 with the Los Angeles Buccaneers. He returned to NFL in 1929 and played for the Minneapolis Red Jackets.

Notes

1899 births
1970 deaths
Players of American football from Minnesota
Los Angeles Buccaneers players
Minneapolis Red Jackets players